Ron Asselstine (born November 6, 1946) is a retired National Hockey League linesman.

He was born in Toronto, Ontario and raised in Guelph, Ontario, Asselstine's NHL officiating career started in 1979 after a long outstanding career with the WHA and ended in 1998.  During his career (in which he wore a helmet from the mid-1980s until his retirement), he officiated 2,002 regular season games (both WHA and NHL), 92 NHL playoff games, and three All-Star games.  From the 1994-95 NHL season until his retirement, he wore uniform number 38. An imposing man, Asselstine's nickname on the ice was "Bear".  This nickname was given to him for his no-nonsense attitude in policing fights, and his ,  body.

On January 28, 1989, at the Boston Garden, when a fan came onto the ice during a game, heading towards referee Bill McCreary, Asselstine charged the fan from behind near the goal line, sending the fan sailing into the end boards (a distance of some ). The fan, Frank Barbaro Jr., 22, was then handcuffed by Boston Police and taken into custody, and was charged with trespassing besides disorderly conduct.

Asselstine was honoured in 2007 with the Caring Canadian Award for his work as founder of the Guelph Wish Fund for Children (begun in 1984).
His award was presented by Governor General Michaëlle Jean.

References

External links
NHLOA.com bio

1946 births
Living people
Canadian ice hockey officials
National Hockey League officials
Ice hockey people from Toronto